Mihai Nadin (born February 2, 1938 in Braşov, Romania) is a scholar and researcher in electrical engineering, computer science, aesthetics, semiotics, human-computer interaction (HCI), computational design, post-industrial society, and anticipatory systems. His publications on these topics number over 200, and he has lectured throughout the world.

Currently Mihai Nadin is a professor at the University of Texas at Dallas, appointed to the Ashbel Smith Professorship in Interactive Arts, Technology, and Computer Science. He is director of the Institute for Research in Anticipatory Systems.

Human-computer interaction 
Nadin's contributions to human-computer interaction (HCI) have a strong foundation in semiotics. Based on his work in Peircean semiotics and his training in computer science, Nadin was the first to recognize that the computer was the "semiotic machine par excellence".

Computational design 
Nadin has opposed the viewpoint that tools that are extensions of human physical abilities, the computer should be considered an extension of the human mind. He founded the world's first program in Computational Design in 1994 at the University of Wuppertal (Germany). Its purpose was twofold: 1. development of a theory of computational design; 2. the design of products and processes through digital means. These products and processes themselves integrate digital technology (they are embedded systems). Thus, the program's long-term goal is the constitution of the world of ubiquitous computing.

References

External links 
Mihai Nadin's Personal Website
 

1938 births
Living people
Romanian computer scientists
Politehnica University of Bucharest alumni
People from Brașov
Rhode Island School of Design faculty
University of Texas at Dallas faculty
Romanian emigrants to the United States
Semioticians